The 2019 Atlantic 10 Conference women's soccer tournament was the postseason women's soccer tournament for the Atlantic 10 Conference held from November 2 through November 10, 2019. The quarterfinals of the tournament were held at campus sites, while the semifinals and final took place at Hermann Stadium in St. Louis, Missouri. The eight-team single-elimination tournament consisted of three rounds based on seeding from regular season conference play. The defending tournament champions were the Saint Louis Billikens, who successfully defended their championship and regular season crown.  This was the Billikens' fourth overall tournament title, and coach Katie Shields' second title.

Bracket

Source:

Schedule

Quarterfinals

Semifinals

Final

Statistics

Goalscorers 
3 Goals
 Courtney Reimer (St. Louis)
 Rachel Sorkenn (George Washington)

2 Goals
 Lauren Bonavita (Massachusetts)
 Sofia Pavon (George Washington)

1 Goal
 Emily Banashefski (La Salle)
 Annabelle Copeland (St. Louis)
 Hannah Friedrich (St. Louis)
 Rebeca Frisk (Massachusetts)
 Emily Gorark (St. Louis)
 Ava Jouvenel (Massachusetts)
 Alli Klug (St. Louis)
 Sini Laaksonen (Massachusetts)
 Megan Nixon (St. Louis)
 Maria Pareja (George Washington)
 Alyssa Seitzer (St. Louis)

All Tournament Team 

Source:

MVP in bold

See also 
 2019 Atlantic 10 Men's Soccer Tournament

References 

 
Atlantic 10 Conference Women's Soccer Tournament